Arvey may refer to:

Surname:
Jacob Arvey (1895–1977), political leader in the city of Chicago, Illinois
Richard D. Arvey, American psychology professor
Verna Arvey (1910–1987), American librettist, pianist and writer

Places:
Saint-Jean-d'Arvey, commune in the Savoie department in the Rhône-Alpes region in southeastern France
Verrens-Arvey, commune in the Savoie department in the Rhône-Alpes region in southeastern France